Nattuchakkeruttu is a 1980 Indian Malayalam film,  directed by Ravi Gupthan and produced by Krishnaswami Reddiar. The film stars Sheela, Sreelatha Namboothiri, Kundara Johny and Meena Menon in the lead roles. The film has musical score by G. Devarajan.

Cast
Sheela
Sreelatha Namboothiri
Kundara Johny
Meena Menon
P. K. Abraham
Sankar Mohan

Soundtrack
The music was composed by G. Devarajan and the lyrics were written by Devadas.

References

External links
 

1980 films
1980s Malayalam-language films